This is a chronological list of women's rights conventions held in the United States. The first convention in the country to focus solely on women's rights was the Seneca Falls Convention held in the summer of 1848 in Seneca Falls, New York. Prior to that, the first abolitionist convention for women was held in New York City in 1837. Elizabeth Cady Stanton considered the first organized women's rights work to date back to the first National Women's Rights Convention held in 1850.

19th century

1830s 
1837

 First National Female Anti-Slavery Society Convention is held in New York City.

1840s 
1848

 July 19–20: Seneca Falls Convention, held in Seneca Falls, New York.
August 2: Rochester Women's Rights Convention is held in Rochester, New York.

1850s 
1850

 April 19–20: Ohio Women's Convention at Salem is held in Salem, Ohio.
October 23–24: First National Woman's Rights Convention, held in Brinley Hall in Worcester, Massachusetts.
1851

 May 28–29: The Ohio Women's Convention at Akron is held in Akron, Ohio and speaker Sojourner Truth gives her 'Ain't I a Woman?' speech.
October 14–15: First Indiana Woman's Rights Convention is held in Dublin, Indiana.
October 15–16: Second National Woman's Rights Convention, held in Brinley Hall in Worcester.

1852

 May 26: Ohio Women's Convention at Massillon.
June 2–3: Pennsylvania Woman's Convention at West Chester.
September 8–10: Third National Women's Rights Convention, held in Syracuse, New York.
1853

 September 6–7: "Mob Convention" is held in New York City.
October 6–8: Fourth National Women's Rights Convention, held in Melodean Hall in Cleveland.

1854

 October 18–20: Fifth National Woman's Rights Convention, held in Sansom Street Hall in Philadelphia.

1855

 October 17–18: Sixth National Woman's Rights Convention, held in Nixon's Hall in Cincinnati.

1856

 November 25–26: Seventh National Woman's Rights Convention held in the Broadway Tabernacle in New York City.

1858

 May 13–14: Eighth National Woman's Rights Convention held in Mozart Hall in New York City.

1859

 May 12: Ninth National Woman's Rights Convention held in Mozart Hall in New York City.

1860s 
1860

 May 10–11: Tenth National Woman's Rights Convention held at The Cooper Union in New York City.
 May 14: First Woman's National Loyal League Convention held at the Church of the Puritans in New York City.
1867

 May 9–10: First annual meeting of the American Equal Rights Association (AERA) is held in New York City.

1869

 November 23: The first Ohio Woman's Suffrage Association (OWSA) convention is held in Cleveland.
 November 24–25: The American Woman Suffrage Association (AWSA) was founded at a convention held in Case Hall in Cleveland.

1870s 
1873

 October 15–17: First Congress of Women of the Association for the Advancement of Women (AAW) is held at the Union League Theater in New York City.

1874

 November 18–20: The Woman's Christian Temperance Union (WCTU) is founded at their first convention held in Cleveland at the Second Presbyterian Church.

1880s 

1888

 November 14–16: The 16th Annual Congress of the AAW is held at the Church of Our Father in Detroit.

1890s 
1890

 February 18: Founding convention of the National American Woman Suffrage Association (NAWSA).
1891

 February 26-March 1: Twenty-Third annual NAWSA convention is held in Albaugh's Opera House in Washington, D.C.
1893

 January 16–19: Twenty-Fifth annual NAWSA convention is held in Washington, D.C.

1895

 July 27–30: The First National Conference of the Colored Women of America is held at Berkeley Hall in Boston.

1896

 November 15–19: First National Jewish Women's Congress is held in Tuxedo Hall in New York City.
1897

 January: NAWSA holds their 29th annual convention in Des Moines, Iowa.

1898

 February 14–19: Thirtieth Annual convention of NAWSA held in Columbia Theater in Washington, D.C.
1899

 April 30-May 6: The thirty-first annual NAWSA convention is held in Grand Rapids, Michigan.
August 14–16: The second annual convention of the NACW is held in Quinn Chapel in Chicago.

20th century

1900s 

1905

 June 29-July 5: The 37th Annual NAWSA convention is held in Portland, Oregon.

1906

 Annual NAWSA Convention is held in Baltimore.

1910s 
1911

 October 19–25: NAWSA holds their annual convention in Louisville, Kentucky in the De Molay Commandery Hall.

1912

 May: Mississippi Valley Suffrage Conference is held in Chicago and Milwaukee.
October 15–18: Forty-fourth New York State Suffrage Convention held in Utica, New York.
November 21–26: Forty-fourth Annual NAWSA conference is held in Philadelphia.
 Midwestern Suffragists' Conference is held in Chicago.

1913

 April 2–4: Mississippi Valley Suffrage Conference is held at the Buckingham Hotel in St. Louis.
November 12–13: First Southern States Woman Suffrage Conference is held in New Orleans.
November 29-December 5: Forty-fifth annual NAWSA convention is held in Washington, D.C.
1914

 March 29–31: Mississippi Valley Suffrage Conference is held in Des Moines, Iowa.
November 12–17: NAWSA holds its annual convention in Nashville, Tennessee.

1915

 Mississippi Valley Suffrage Conference is held.

1916

 September 6–10: Annual NAWSA Convention is held in Atlantic City, New Jersey.
May 7–10: Mississippi Valley Suffrage Conference is held in Minneapolis.
June: The Woman's Party Convention is held in Chicago, where the National Woman's Party (NWP) is formed.
1917

 Mississippi Valley Suffrage Conference is held.
1918

 May 10: National Woman's Party Convention held in Hartford, Connecticut.

1920s 
1920

 February 12–18: Final NAWSA convention, the "Victory Convention" is held in Chicago.

1960s 
1969

 April 18–20: Connecticut College Black Womanhood Conference is held.

1970s 
1971

 May 28–30: La Conferencia de Mujeres por la Raza is held in Houston.

See also 

 List of women's conferences
Feminism in the United States
Women's suffrage in the United States

References

Sources 

 

Lists of conferences
Conventions in the United States
Feminism in the United States
Women's rights in the United States
Women's conferences